Henry Hoke is an American author known for hybrid books. He directs Enter>text, a living literary journal, and his short fiction and non-fiction have been published in Electric Literature, Hobart, The Collagist, Birkensnake, and Joyland.

Early life and education
Hoke was born in Charlottesville, Virginia. He is a great-grandson of Walter W. Bankhead and a cousin of Tallulah Bankhead. He earned his MFA in creative writing from California Institute of the Arts.

Enter>text
Hoke co-created Enter>text, a series of large-scale immersive literary events, in Los Angeles in 2011. Enter>text has been performed at the &NOW Festival, Machine Project, Human Resources, the Pasadena Museum of California Art, and the Neutra VDL House. Over 150 performers have appeared in Enter>text, including Kate Durbin, Kenyatta A.C. Hinkle, Douglas Kearney and Ryka Aoki.

Awards
Hoke's story collection Genevieves won the 2015 book prize for prose from Subito Press at the University of Colorado, Boulder.

Bibliography
The Book of Endless Sleepovers (Civil Coping Mechanisms, 2016)
Genevieves (Subito, 2017)
The Groundhog Forever (WTAW, 2021)
Sticker (Bloomsbury, 2022)

References

Year of birth missing (living people)
Living people
21st-century American male writers
California Institute of the Arts alumni
Writers from Charlottesville, Virginia